Starbook, subtitled "A Magical Tale of Love and Regeneration", is a 2007 novel by Nigerian poet and novelist Ben Okri.

External links
Reviews
 "Bookworm Review: Starbook", SA bookworm (South Africa), 25 November 2007
 Ben Brown, "Some day her prince will come", The Observer (UK), 19 August 2007.
 Elspeth Sandys, "Falling star" (review), The Listener (New Zealand), 1 December 2007.

2007 British novels
Nigerian fantasy novels
Novels by Ben Okri
2007 Nigerian novels